Lars Mikael Lundberg (born 13 August 1973) is a Swedish professional golfer. He has won three times on the European Tour.

Early life and amateur career
Lundberg was born in Helsingborg, Sweden. He represented Sweden in the 1994 Eisenhower Trophy.

Professional career
Lundberg turned professional in 1995. He spent several years on the developmental Challenge Tour, where he was victorious in the 1997 Himmerland Open, and won a place on the main European Tour via a fourth-place finish on the 2000 Challenge Tour Rankings. After two steady seasons on tour, a 137th-place finish on the 2003 Order of Merit cost him his European Tour card and he returned to the Challenge Tour in 2004.

Lundberg won back his place on the European Tour by winning the 2005 Cadillac Russian Open, which was an official money event on both tours, but finished outside the top 150 on the 2006 Order of Merit, and returned to the Challenge Tour the next season. Another top ten finish on the Challenge Tour rankings in 2007 saw him regain his European Tour card for 2008, when he won the Russian Open for the second time, giving him a two-year exemption on the main tour.

In 2017 Lundberg won the Lumine Lakes Open, an early-season event on the third-tier Nordic Golf League. In 2019 he won the World Snooker Jessie May Championship and the end-of-season Tour Championships on the PGA EuroPro Tour, as well as the tour's Order of Merit. In April 2021 he won the PGA Catalunya Resort Championship on the Nordic Golf League at the second hole of a sudden-death playoff.

Professional wins (11)

European Tour wins (3)

1Dual-ranking event with the Challenge Tour

European Tour playoff record (2–0)

Challenge Tour wins (3)

1Dual-ranking event with the European Tour

Challenge Tour playoff record (1–0)

PGA EuroPro Tour wins (2)

Nordic Golf League wins (2)

Swedish Golf Tour wins (1)

Other wins (1)
1995 Slovenian Open

Team appearances
Amateur
European Boys' Team Championship (representing Sweden): 1991 (winners)
European Youths' Team Championship: 1992 (winners), 1994
European Amateur Team Championship (representing Sweden): 1993
Eisenhower Trophy (representing Sweden): 1994

See also
2007 Challenge Tour graduates
2011 European Tour Qualifying School graduates
2012 European Tour Qualifying School graduates
2013 European Tour Qualifying School graduates

References

External links

Swedish male golfers
European Tour golfers
Sportspeople from Helsingborg
1973 births
Living people